Shelley Bradley (born 1968), who writes under the pen name Shayla Black, is an American author of erotic romance novels. She has written over 80 novels. Several of her novels include references to BDSM. She is most known for her Wicked Lovers series, which includes 12 novels and 7 novellas.

She lives with her family in North Texas.

Biography
 Misadventures of a Backup Bride

Wicked Lovers series

Masters of Ménage

References

External links
 Official website

1968 births
Living people
21st-century American novelists
American romantic fiction novelists
American erotica writers
Pseudonymous women writers
21st-century pseudonymous writers